Carboxydothermus is a genus of thermophilic, anaerobic bacteria from the family of Thermoanaerobacteraceae.

Phylogeny
The currently accepted taxonomy is based on the List of Prokaryotic names with Standing in Nomenclature (LPSN) and National Center for Biotechnology Information (NCBI).

See also
 List of bacteria genera
 List of bacterial orders

References

Further reading 
 
 
 

 

Thermoanaerobacterales
Bacteria genera
Thermophiles
Anaerobes